Kul Badam may refer to:

Kul Badam-e Nurmorad
Kul Badam-e Yavar